La Canourgue is a commune in the Lozère department in southern France. It is sometimes referred to in French as "La petite Venise lozérienne", the Little Venice of Lozère.

The commune served as a location for the 2006 film A Good Year.

Population

See also
Communes of the Lozère department

References

Gallery

Canourgue